Fran Schwenk (born c. 1948) is a former American football player and coach.  He served as the head football coach at Doane College from 1984 to 2004 and at William Jewell College from 2005 to 2009, compiling a career college football coaching record of 136–116–3.

Coaching career
Schwenk was the 31st head football coach at Doane College in Crete, Nebraska and he held that position for 21 seasons, from 1984 until 2004.  His coaching record at Doane was 114–87–3.

Head coaching record

References

1940s births
Living people
Doane Tigers football coaches
Missouri Western Griffons football coaches
Northwest Missouri State Bearcats football coaches
Northwest Missouri State Bearcats football players
William Jewell Cardinals football coaches
High school football coaches in Missouri